= Taktse Ogyen Choekhorling Monastery =

Tibetan monastery in Sikkim, India

Religion
- Affiliation: Tibetan Buddhism

Location
- Location: Sikkim, India
- Country: India

Taktse Ogyen Choekhorling Monastery is a Tibetan Buddhist monastery near Gangtok in Sikkim, northeastern India.
